Carlo Bonomi (12 March 1937 – 6 August 2022) was an Italian voice actor, who was best known for his voiceover work as the voice of Mr. Linea in the animated series La Linea as well as Pingu and various other characters in series 1-4 of the stop-motion children's television series of the same name.

Career
Bonomi voiced many characters for the Italian advertising show Carosello. The language of noises he had developed and used for the earlier Osvaldo Cavandoli's  La Linea from 1971 to 1986 was reinterpreted for the acclaimed TV series Pingu on SF DRS during its first four seasons produced between 1990 and 2000, where Bonomi voiced all the characters without a script. His grammelot was originally intended to be a parody of the Milanese dialect, and it was inspired by three abstract languages traditionally used by clowns in France and Italy.

When in 2003 the show's rights were acquired by HIT Entertainment, Bonomi was replaced by London-based voice actors David Sant and Marcello Magni.

In 1984 he provided the laughter voices for the cartoon series Stripy. In 1985 he recorded the railway announcements for the central station of Milan which remained in use until 2008. Bonomi was also very active as a voice actor in Italian radio dramas, and was the Italian voice for several popular cartoon characters, including Mickey Mouse and Fred Flintstone.

In 2008 he acted the voices for the yellow tribe in Spore, which was also his final role before his retirement from acting later that year.

Death
Bonomi died on 6 August 2022 in his home town in Milan, Italy, at the age of 85.

Filmography

Film
La sexilinea (1972) – La Linea
Mr. Rossi Looks for Happiness (1976) – Additional voices
Mr. Rossi's Dreams (1977) –  Additional voices
Mr. Rossi's Vacation (1978) – Additional voices

Animation
La Linea (1971–1986) – La Linea
Calimero (1972–1975) – Paperazzi
 The Red and the Blue (1976-2005) – Red / Blue
Stripy (1984) – Stripy / All characters
Pingu (1990–2000) – Pingu / All characters (voice)
Pingu: A Very Special Wedding (1997) – Pingu / All characters

Video games
Pingu: A Barrel of Fun! (1997) – Pingu, Robby
Fun! Fun! Pingu (1999) – Pingu, Penguins
Spore (2008) – Additional voices

Live-action
Eurovision Song Contest (TV series) (1965, 1990, 1992) – Swiss Commentator (voice)
Le mie prigioni (TV series) (1968) – Il segretario
Ogni Regno (1969) – Narrator (voice)
La freccia nera (TV series) (1969) – Un alabardiere
Durante l'estate (1971) – Voice dubbing (uncredited)

Other works
Milano Centrale railway station (1985–2008) – Announcer

References

External links 

 

1937 births
2022 deaths
20th-century Italian male actors
21st-century Italian male actors
Italian male television actors
Italian male voice actors
Male actors from Milan